The International Journal of Mentoring and Coaching in Education is a quarterly peer-reviewed academic journal covering research on and theory of coaching and mentoring as it applies to education. It was established in 2012 and is published by Emerald Publishing. The editor-in-chief is Andrew Hobson (University of Brighton).

Abstracting and indexing 
The journal is abstracted and indexed by the Emerging Sources Citation Index and Scopus.

References

External links

English-language journals
Education journals
Quarterly journals
Emerald Group Publishing academic journals
Publications established in 2012